Aftabeh may refer to:
 
 Aftabeh 
 Aftabeh, Ardabil
 Aftabeh, West Azerbaijan
 Aftabeh (toilet pitcher)

Sea also
 Aftab (disambiguation)